Dezső Korda (8 January 1864 – 1 April 1919) was a mechanical engineer born in Kisbér, Hungary.
Korda finished his education in 1885 at the Budapest, in  Royal Joseph Technical University (present-day Budapest University of Technology and Economics). After that he worked as electrical engineer in France and Switzerland. During the First World War Korda was a lecturer at ETH Zurich for wireless telegraphy and high frequency machines.

He invented the variable capacitor with air dielectric, and received in Germany a patent for invention on 13 December 1893.

He was awarded the French Legion of Honour in 1907 for his scientific achievements.

References

1864 births
1919 deaths
Hungarian inventors
Hungarian mechanical engineers
Recipients of the Legion of Honour